Francinne (born 22 December 1993), whose birth name is Francine de Almeida Porto, is a Brazilian singer, known for the hits "Tum Tum" partner with Wanessa Camargo and "Segue o Baile" with Clau.

Biography and career 
Francinne began her career in 2011, officially covering Britney Spears in Brazil. In 2015, she released her debut single "I'm Alive", and the track was featured on the official soundtrack of Rede Globo's soap opera "Babilônia".

She also lent her voice to TV commercials and other dubbing projects and assisted with the composition of songs for the soundtracks of SBT's soap operas Carinha de Anjo and As Aventuras de Poliana. 

In 2017, she signed with Universal Music label, now pursuing a solo career as Francinne, scoring hits such as ‘Tum Tum’ with Wanessa Camargo, ‘Cinderelas’ with Rebecca and “Aceleradinha” with MC Zaac. After numerous releases, she caught the attention of South Korean artists and received an invitation from singer Spax to share the vocals of the song "Te Quiero Mas". This song, a duet in two Korean and Portuguese languages, marked the first musical partnership between the two nations, catching the attention of South Korean businessmen who landed her an artistic career contract announcing a K-POP project and her going to South Korea to record a single and MV.

After the international experience, the singer released her first EP entitled TAKEDOWN.

Francinne opened her own record label to be able to give voice to the many independent singers who are looking for an opportunity and cannot find a place in the market that is still sexist. Francinne has adopted Korean culture in her daily life, after recording her feature with singer Spax, she became increasingly connected to Korean culture, awakening the interest of big businessmen in the K-POP industry in managing abroad, after months of preparation, the singer landed on July 12, 2021, in South Korea to finalize her international project and debut in South Korean territory.

Without Asian ancestry Francinne is the first foreign singer to launch a KPOP project simultaneously between the two nations. All production will be done by renowned professionals who have signed productions by groups like Red Velvet, Super Junior, Jessie among others, and the first single arrives in early November 2021 accompanied by a music video.

Discography

 Corpo Caliente (2018)
 Bom Demais (2018)
 TumTum (2018)
 Segue o Baile (2019)
 Aceleradinha (2019)
 Cinderelas (2019)
 Sintonia (2020)
 Te Quiero Mas (2020)
 Atura ou Surta (2020)
 Takedown (2021)

References

External links

 Francinne on Instagram
 Francinne on Spotify
 Francinne on YouTube

1993 births
Living people
Brazilian people of European descent
Brazilian Latin pop singers
Brazilian women pop singers
Brazilian contemporary R&B singers
Brazilian women singer-songwriters
Brazilian singer-songwriters
Brazilian television actresses
Brazilian film actresses
Brazilian female dancers
Brazilian women philanthropists
Universal Music Group artists
Feminist musicians
Latin pop singers
Reggaeton musicians
Funk carioca musicians
English-language singers from Brazil
Spanish-language singers of Brazil
Korean-language singers of Brazil
21st-century Brazilian singers
21st-century Brazilian women singers
Brazilian philanthropists